Artyom Denisovich Kotik (born 12 June 2001) is a Russian football player who plays for FC Neftekhimik Nizhnekamsk.

Club career
He made his debut in the Russian Football National League for FC Neftekhimik Nizhnekamsk on 15 March 2020 in a game against FC Khimki, he substituted Merabi Uridia in the 90th minute.

References

External links
 
 Profile by Russian Football National League
 

2001 births
Living people
Russian footballers
Association football forwards
FC Neftekhimik Nizhnekamsk players
Russian First League players